The Calvo Building is a historic building along no. 266 Escolta corner Soda Streets, Binondo, Manila, Philippines. Built in 1938, it is an outstanding example of beaux-arts architecture. It served as the home of the radio station DZBB-AM before moving to its present location in Diliman, Quezon City. It now houses the Escolta Museum which contains memorabilia from the past. The building is designed by Ar. Fernando H. Ocampo, Sr.

Marker from the National Historical Commission of the Philippines 

The historical marker entitled Gusaling Calvo was installed on August 14, 2018, inside the building. It was installed by the National Historical Commission of the Philippines.

Details

References

External links

Buildings and structures in Binondo
Buildings and structures completed in 1938
20th-century architecture in the Philippines